Freedom Blues is the third album from Jamaican reggae musician Jah Cure. It was released in 2005 and includes contributions from Sizzla.

Track listing
 Songs Of Freedom
 Jah Bless Me
 Good Morning Jah Jah
 Sunny Day
 King In The Jungle
 Chant
 Troddin' The Valley
 Spread Jah Love
 Love Is The Solution
 Guide Us Jah
 Praises
 Get Up Stand Up
 Give It To Them
 Dancehall Vibe
 Move On
 Hi Hi

References

2005 albums
Jah Cure albums